Events from the year 1780 in the United States.

Incumbents
President of the Second Continental Congress: Samuel Huntington

Events

January–March
 January 16 – American Revolutionary War – Battle of Cape St. Vincent:  British Admiral Sir George Rodney defeats a Spanish fleet.
 February 3 – American Revolutionary War: Battle of Young's House
 March 1– Pennsylvania is the first American state to abolish slavery.
 March 29–May 12 – American Revolutionary War: Siege of Charleston

April–June

 April 14 – American Revolutionary War: Battle of Monck's Corner
 May 6 – American Revolutionary War: Battle of Lenud's Ferry
 May 12 – American Revolutionary War: Charleston, South Carolina is taken by British forces.
 May 13 – Cumberland Compact signed by American settlers in the Cumberland Valley of Tennessee.
 May 19 – New England's Dark Day: An unaccountable darkness spreads over New England, regarded by some observers as a fulfillment of Bible prophecy.
 May 25–August 4 – American Revolutionary War: Bird's invasion of Kentucky
 May 29 – American Revolutionary War: Waxhaw Massacre: Loyalist forces under Col. Banastre Tarleton kill surrendering American soldiers.
 June 7 – American Revolutionary War: Battle of Connecticut Farms
 June 10 – American Revolutionary War: Battle of Mobley's Meeting House
 June 20 – American Revolutionary War: Battle of Ramsour's Mill
 June 23 – American Revolutionary War – Battle of Springfield: The American victory at Springfield effectively ends British ambitions in New Jersey.

July–September

 July 11 – Expédition Particulière: French soldiers arrive in Newport, Rhode Island to reinforce colonists in the American Revolutionary War.
 July 12 – American Revolutionary War: Battle of Williamson's Plantation
 July 21 – American Revolutionary War: Battle of Colson's Mill
 August 1 – American Revolutionary War: Battle of Rocky Mount
 August 6 – American Revolutionary War: Battle of Hanging Rock
 August 8 – American Revolutionary War: Battle of Piqua
 August 16 – American Revolutionary War: Battle of Camden: British troops inflict heavy losses on a Patriot army at Camden, South Carolina.
 August 18 
American Revolutionary War: Battle of Fishing Creek
American Revolutionary War: Battle of Musgrove Mill
 August 28 – American Revolutionary War: Battle of Black Mingo
 September 21
American Revolutionary War: Battle of Wahab's Plantation
Benedict Arnold gives detailed plans of West Point to Major John André. Three days later, André is captured with papers revealing that Arnold was planning to surrender West Point to the British.
 September 25 – Benedict Arnold flees to British-held New York.
 September 26 – American Revolutionary War: Battle of Charlotte

October–December

 October 2 –  American Revolutionary War: In Tappan, New York, British spy John André is hanged by American forces.
 October 7 – American Revolutionary War – Battle of Kings Mountain: Patriot militia forces annihilate a Loyalists under British Major Patrick Ferguson at Kings Mountain in South Carolina.
 October 9 – Great Hurricane of 1780: The deadliest Atlantic Hurricane in recorded history
 October 16 – American Revolutionary War – Royalton Raid
October 17 – American Revolutionary War – Battle of Shallow Ford
 October 19 – American Revolutionary War – Battle of Klock's Field
October 25
 American Revolutionary War – Battle of Tearcoat Swamp
 John Hancock is sworn in as the first governor of Massachusetts.
 November 9 – American Revolutionary War – Battle of Fishdam Ford
 November 20 – American Revolutionary War – Battle of Blackstock's Farm

Undated
 Woodford Reserve bourbon whiskey distillery begins operation in Kentucky.

Ongoing
 American Revolutionary War (1775–1783)

Births
 January 14 – Henry Baldwin, Associate Justice of the Supreme Court of the U.S. from 1830 to 1844 (died 1827)
 January 30 – Israel Pickens, U.S. Senator from Alabama from 1821 to 1825 (died 1827)
 February 1 – David Porter, naval officer (died 1843)
 February 19 – Richard McCarty, politician (died 1844)
 March 6 – Lucy Barnes, religious writer (died 1809)
 March 20 – Thomas Metcalfe, U.S. Senator from Kentucky from 1848 to 1849 (died 1855)
 March 25 – Joseph Ritner, politician (died 1869)
 April 4 – Edward Hicks, painter (died 1849)
 April 7 – William Ellery Channing, influential Unitarian theologian and minister (died 1842)
 May 1 – John McKinley, U.S. Senator from Alabama from 1826 to 1831 and in 1837; Associate Justice of the Supreme Court of the U.S. from 1837 to 1852 (died 1852)
 June 21 – Martin D. Hardin, U.S. Senator from Kentucky from 1816 to 1817 (died 1823) 
 July 9 – Ephraim Bateman, U.S. Senator from New Jersey from 1826 to 1829 (died 1829)
 August 20 – William Woodbridge, Governor of Michigan from 1840 to 1841 and U.S. Senator from Michigan from 1841 to 1847 (died 1861)
 August 29 – Richard Rush, U.S. Attorney General under James Madison; U.S. Secretary of the Treasury under John Q. Adams (died 1859)
 September 8 – George Troup, U.S. Senator from Georgia from 1816 to 1818 and from 1829 to 1833 (died 1856)
 October 17 – Richard Mentor Johnson, U.S. Senator from Kentucky from 1819 to 1829 and 9th Vice President of the United States from 1837 to 1841 (died 1850)
 October 22 – John Forsyth, U.S. Senator from Georgia from 1818 to 1819 and from 1829 to 1834 (died 1841)
 October 25
 Philip Hone, Mayor of New York City from 1826 to 1827 (died 1851)
 Freeman Walker, U.S. Senator from Georgia from 1819 to 1821 (died 1827)
 November 8 – Samuel A. Foote, Governor of Connecticut from 1834 to 1835; U.S. Senator from Connecticut from 1827 to 1833 (died 1846)
 December 31 – Gideon Tomlinson, U.S. Senator from Connecticut from 1831 to 1837 (died 1854)
 William Cardell, grammarian and story writer for boys (died 1828)

Deaths
 January 31 – Jonathan Carver, explorer (born 1710)
 June 3 – Thomas Hutchinson, last governor of Massachusetts Bay Colony (born 1711)
 August 19 – Johann de Kalb, Franconian-French major general in the Continental Army, mortally wounded in Battle of Camden (born 1721 in Principality of Bayreuth)
 September 8 – Enoch Poor, brigadier general in the Continental Army (born 1736)
 October 2 – John André, British Army officer, hanged as a spy by the Continental Army (born 1750 in Great Britain)
 Joseph Green, poet, satirist and clergyman (born 1706)

See also
Timeline of the American Revolution (1760–1789)

References

External links
 

 
1780s in the United States
United States
United States
Years of the 18th century in the United States